The 2019 FA Challenge Cup was the 46th edition of the FA Challenge Cup, Botswana's premier football knockout tournament. It was sponsored by Orange and was known as the Orange FA Cup or Orange FA Cup Season 1 for sponsorship reasons. It started with the preliminary round on the weekend of 16 February and concluded with the final on 15 June 2019.

Botswana Premier League side Gaborone United were the defending champions but were eliminated by Extension Gunners on penalties in the round of 32. Orapa United went on to win the title for the first time in history, making them the first Orapa side to do so.

Qualifying rounds
All 16 Premier League teams automatically qualified to the round of 32. The top 8 teams from First Division South and top 8 from First Division North had to go through the preliminary round and were joined by the 16 regional champions. Winners of this round qualified for the round of 32.

Preliminary round
The preliminary round draw took place on 23 January 2019. The draw was seeded into two, namely the northern and southern blocks. Southern block games were played on 16 and 17 February while northern block games were played on 23 and 24 February.

Southern block

Northern block

Round of 32
The round of 32 draw was conducted on 24 February 2019 after the conclusion of the preliminary round. It was not seeded. Jwaneng Fighters, Atlanta Chiefs, Black Rangers, Black Peril, Sand Diamonds, Peacemakers, Kazungula Young Fighters and Santa Green from Division One are the lowest ranked teams still in the competition.

Round of 16
The round of 16 draw was conducted on 4 April 2019. It was not seeded. Jwaneng Fighters, Sand Diamonds and Kazungula Young Fighters from Division One are the lowest ranked teams still in the competition.

Quarterfinals
The quarterfinal draw was conducted on 14 April after the conclusion of the round of 16. It was not seeded. Jwaneng Fighters and Kazungula Young Fighters from Division One are the lowest ranked teams still in the competition.

Semifinals
The semifinal draw was conducted on 28 April after the Jwaneng Fighters and Police XI game.

Final

Awards
Top goalscorer |  Omaatla Kebatho (7 goals) | Orapa United
Player of the tournament |  Mothusi Johnson | Orapa United
Goalkeeper of the tournament |  Lesenya Malapela | Orapa United
Coach of the tournament |  Mogomotsi Mpote | Orapa United
Referee of the tournament |  Joshua Bondo
Assistant referee of the tournament |  Mogomotsi Morakile
Fan of the tournament |  Luka Daniel | Township Rollers

References

2019–20 in African football